Kuala Pegang is a small town in Baling District, Kedah, Malaysia.

Location
The town is located between the towns Tawar and Kupang. It lies on the Penang-Kelantan highway Federal Route 4.

Education
The town has two primary schools - SJK (C) Chin Hwa and Sekolah Kebangsaan Kuala Pegang, and one secondary school - Sekolah Menengah Kebangsaan Kuala Pegang.

Events
There is a weekly market on Wednesdays.

References
Adam, Ramlah binti, Samuri, Abdul Hakim bin & Fadzil, Muslimin bin (2004). Sejarah Tingkatan 3. Dewan Bahasa dan Pustaka. .

Baling District
Towns in Kedah